Nicholas William Downs is an American actor. Downs has played supporting roles in several films, including Constantine (2005), The Girl Next Door (2004), and Pearl Harbor (2001). He played the main character in "Is It Just Me?" (2010). He also appeared in  16 to Life (2009) and Anderson's Cross (2007). On television, Downs has appeared in episodes of Cold Case (2007) and Boston Public (2002).

Personal life
Downs is gay.

Filmography

References

External links

 Official website

American male film actors
American gay actors
Living people
Male actors from Des Moines, Iowa
1976 births